William Gibson (1644–1702) was an English miniature painter. He was a pupil and copyist of Lely.

Life 
William Gibson was nephew of Richard Gibson, the dwarf, from whom he received instruction. He was also a pupil of Sir Peter Lely, and was very successful in his copies of Lely's works. He attained great eminence as a miniature painter, and was largely employed by the nobility. At the sale of Lely's collection of prints and drawings by the old masters, Gibson bought a great number, and added considerably to them by subsequent purchases. He resided in the parish of St. Giles-in-the-Fields, and died of a "lethargy" in 1702, aged 58. He was buried at Richmond in Surrey.

See also 

 Edward Gibson (painter)

References

Sources 

 Walpole, Horace (1876). Anecdotes of Painting in England. Dallaway, James; Wornum, Ralph N. (eds.). Vol. 2. London: Chatto and Windus. p. 151.
 
 "Gibson, William". Benezit Dictionary of Artists. Oxford Art Online. 2011. Retrieved 20 September 2022.
Attribution:
 

1644 births
1702 deaths
17th-century English painters